Acheilognathus deignani is a species of freshwater ray-finned fish in the genus Acheilognathus.  It is endemic to northern Vietnam in the Mekong River.  It grows to a maximum length of 5.2 cm.

Named in honor of Herbert Girton Deignan (1906-1968), Associate Curator of Birds, U.S. National Museum, who collected the type specimen.

References

Acheilognathus
Taxa named by Hugh McCormick Smith
Fish described in 1945
Fish of Vietnam

Endemic fauna of Vietnam